Lingel A. "Sonny" Winters (June 2, 1900October 5, 1945) was an American football player.  He played two seasons in the National Football League (NFL) as a quarterback for the Columbus Tigers (1923–1924). He was selected as the third-team quarterback on the 1924 All-Pro Team.

References

1900 births
1945 deaths
People from Napoleon, Ohio
Players of American football from Ohio
American football quarterbacks
Ohio Wesleyan Battling Bishops football players
Columbus Tigers players